Katima Mulilo Rural is a constituency in the Zambezi Region of Namibia. It comprises the area south of the town of Katima Mulilo, the regional capital. As of 2020, the constituency had 6,712 registered voters.

Politics
In the 2004 presidential election,  Katima Mulilo Rural voted overwhelmingly for Hifikepunye Pohamba of Swapo party. Pohamba won with 3776 (72%) votes, followed by Ben Ulenga of the Congress of Democrats, who received 480 (9%) votes, Henk Mudge of the Republican Party who received 466 (9%) votes and Katuutire Kaura of the Democratic Turnhalle Alliance, who received 386 (7.5%) votes.

The 2015 regional election was won by Wardens Matengu Simushi of the SWAPO Party with 1,662 votes, followed by Daniel Sinyemba Sankwasa of the Rally for Democracy and Progress (RDP) with 182 votes and Annaberia Nswahu Maswahu of the Democratic Turnhalle Alliance (DTA) with 149 votes. Simushi was reelected in the 2020 regional election, obtaining 1,290 votes. The opposition candidates Sankwasa, now Popular Democratic Movement (PDM, the new name of the DTA), and Innocent Mahoto from the Independent Patriots for Change (IPC, an opposition party formed in August 2020) received 352 and 303 votes, respectively.

References

Constituencies of Zambezi Region
States and territories established in 1992
1992 establishments in Namibia